The 1986 Ibero-American Championships (Spanish: II Campeonato Iberoamericano de Atletismo) was an athletics competition which was held at the Estadio Pedro Marrero in Havana, Cuba from 27 to 28 September 1986. A total of 36 events, comprising 21 men's and 15 women's events, were contested by sixteen countries. It was the second edition of the Ibero-American Championships, and the first to be held in Latin America. The Chilean city of Valparaíso was initially chosen to host the event, but the competition was moved after organisation difficulties. High temperatures at the venue affected athletic performances, particularly in the longer distance events.

The host nation, Cuba, easily topped the table with fifteen gold medals and a total of 43 medals. Spain was the second most successful country (9 golds, 22 in total) and Brazil was third with four golds and fifteen medals overall. The positions of these top three countries remained unchanged from those at the previous edition of the championships in 1983.

Among the notable medallists was Brazilian Robson da Silva, won completed a sprint double and recorded a South American record of 10.02 seconds in the 100 metres. Ana Fidelia Quirot of Cuba won both the women's 400 metres and 800 metres events. Seventeen-year-old Luis Bueno set a world youth record of 8.25 m to win the men's long jump. Another young athlete, 18-year-old high jumper Javier Sotomayor, won his first ever senior gold medal at an international athletics championships. Adauto Domingues of Brazil won the steeplechase gold and a silver in the 5000 m, while Portugal's Rosa Oliveira was twice runner-up in the 1500 metres and 3000 metres events.

The men's marathon race was dropped from the main programme and was instead held as a separate competition – the Ibero American Marathon Championships. Alfonso Abellán was the race winner that year while Manuel Vera and Radamés González were second and third respectively.

Medal summary

Men

Women

Medal table

Note: The final medal count on the official report differs as it includes the results of the Ibero-American Marathon Championship, which was held in Seville on 2 February before the main event. Spain's Alfonso Abellán was the winner, followed by Manuel Vera of Mexico and Cuban Radamés González rounded out the podium.

Participation
Of the twenty-two founding members of the Asociación Iberoamericana de Atletismo, nineteen presented delegations for the second championships (one more than the first edition). Ecuador, Panama, Puerto Rico and Venezuela all took part for the first time. The absent nations were Costa Rica, Honduras and the Dominican Republic. A total of 220 athletes participated in the competition. However, only 200 participating athletes (including some guest athletes) from 17 countries were counted by analysing the official result list. Athletes from Bolivia and Paraguay could not be retrieved.  The higher number probably contains coaches and/or officials registered for the event.

 (22)
 (22)
 (5)
 (4)
 (62)
 (4)
 (1)
 (4)
 (12)
 (4)
 (4)
 (7)
 (9)
 (1)
 (31)
 (6)
 (2)

References

Results
El Atletismo Ibero-Americano – San Fernando 2010. RFEA. Retrieved on 2011-11-14.

Ibero-American Championships in Athletics
Ibero-American
Ibero-American
Sport in Havana
International athletics competitions hosted by Cuba
September 1986 sports events in North America